Francesco Barberino Benici (1642 – 1702) was an Italian mathematician.

He was among the first popularizers of mathematics for shopkeepers, along with Elia Del Re, Christopher Clavius, and  Domenico Griminelli.

Works

References 

Italian mathematicians
1702 deaths
1642 births